Nazyr Yunuzovich Mankiev (born January 27, 1985 in Surkhakhi, Ingushetia, Soviet Union) is an Ingush wrestler who won a gold medal at the 2008 Summer Olympics in Greco-Roman wrestling. Resident of Krasnoyarsk.

References

 bio on fila-wrestling.com
 

1985 births
Living people
Russian male sport wrestlers
Olympic wrestlers of Russia
Wrestlers at the 2008 Summer Olympics
Olympic gold medalists for Russia
Ingush people
People from Nazranovsky District
Olympic medalists in wrestling
Medalists at the 2008 Summer Olympics
World Wrestling Championships medalists
European Wrestling Championships medalists